Zhang Yu (born 26 September 1976) is a Chinese former professional tennis player. He is the husband and former coach of retired WTA Tour player Zheng Jie.

Zhang represented China in a total of 10 Davis Cup ties between 1998 and 2001, for wins in four singles rubbers.

On the ATP Tour, Zhang made singles main draw appearances at the Shanghai Open in both 1998 and 2000.

References

External links
 
 
 

1976 births
Living people
Chinese male tennis players